Gabriel Spera is an American poet.

Life
He graduated from Cornell University, and from University of North Carolina at Greensboro, with an M.F.A.

He lives in Los Angeles.

His work appeared in Cimarron Review, Prairie Schooner, The Missouri Review,

Awards
 2009 National Endowment for the Arts, Fellowship
 2005 Dana Awards, finalist
 2005 Dogwood Poetry Prize, finalist
 2004 PEN USA-West Literary Book Award for Poetry
 2003 Pushcart Prize Nomination
 2002 National Poetry Series
 1995 Villa Montalvo Biennial Poetry Competition, Honorable Mention
 1991 Associated Writing Programs, Intro Award,
 1989 Randall Jarrell Fellowship, UNC-G,

Works

Anthology

References

External links
 "Author's website"

Year of birth missing (living people)
Living people
American male poets
Cornell University alumni
University of North Carolina at Greensboro alumni